ENAER T-35 Pillán (Mapudungún: volcano or ancestral spirit) is a Chilean propeller-driven basic trainer aircraft. The student and the instructor sit in tandem. Production ceased in 1991 after 7 years but restarted briefly in 1998.

Design and development
Prior to the eighties Chile possessed a decrepit fleet of military trainers obtained under the Mutual Defense Assistance Act. However, these trainers had become exceedingly difficult to repair following passage of a US arms embargo in 1976. The PA-28R-300 Pillán was developed by Piper Aircraft in the United States as a two-seat military trainer for assembly in Chile, based on a PA-32R fuselage with a new center-section and wing stressed for aerobatics. The first prototype designated XBT first flew at Lakeland on 6 March 1981 and was followed by a second prototype, designated YBT. The second prototype first flew on 31 August 1981 and was then delivered to Chile. The prototype XBT was delivered to Chile in January 1982 but was written off on 10 March 1982. Production of kits at Vero Beach Municipal Airport commenced with three pre-production kits which were delivered for assembly in Chile in 1982, Vero Beach then produced 120 kits for assembly in Chile for the Chilean and Spanish Air Force. The first production aircraft was delivered by ENAER to the Chilean Air Force Air Academy in August 1985. The Spanish aircraft were assembled in Spain by CASA.

Apart from a few turbine powered aircraft, all Pilláns were powered by a 300 hp (224 kW) Textron Lycoming AEIO-540-K1K5 six cylinder horizontally opposed piston engine.

In 1985 a turboprop variant was developed by ENAER as the T-35A Aucan. In early 1986 one of the piston-engined pre-production aircraft was sent to Soloy Aviation Solutions in the United States for modification to install a 420 shp Allison 250B-17D engine.

Variants

Piper PA-28R-300 Pillan
Two Piper built prototypes.
T-35A
Two-seat primary training aircraft for the Chilean Air Force. 60 delivered by 1990.
T-35B
Two-seat instrument training aircraft for the Chilean Air Force. 20 delivered by 1990.
T-35C
Two-seat primary training aircraft for the Spanish Air and Space Force, known as the E.26 Tamiz. 41 delivered by 1987.
T-35D
Two-seat primary and instrument training aircraft for Panama and Paraguay.
T-35DT
Turboprop powered version, powered by a 420-ehp (313-kW) Allison 250-B17D turboprop engine. Original designation T-35XT.
T-35S
Single-seat aerobatic aircraft.
T-35T Aucan
Improved turboprop powered version.
Pillan 2000
Proposed (1998) updated version of the T-35 Pillan with new wing.

Operators

 Chilean Air Force operates 31 aircraft as of 2017.

 Dominican Air Force operates four aircraft as of 2017.

 Ecuadorian Navy – operates three as of 2017.

 Air Force of El Salvador – operates three as of 2017.

 Guatemalan Air Force – operates four as of 2017.

 National Air and Naval Service of Panama – operates four as of 2017.

 Paraguayan Air Force – operates 9 as of 2017.

 Spanish Air and Space Force – ordered 41, operates 35 as of 2017.

Specifications (T-35A)

See also

Notes

References

External links

 ENAER

Pillan
1980s Chilean military trainer aircraft
Single-engined tractor aircraft
Low-wing aircraft
Piper aircraft
Aircraft first flown in 1981